Abandon, abandoned, or abandonment may refer to:

Common uses
 Abandonment (emotional), a subjective emotional state in which people feel undesired, left behind, insecure, or discarded
 Abandonment (legal), a legal term regarding property
 Child abandonment, the extralegal abandonment of children
 Lost, mislaid, and abandoned property, legal status of property after abandonment and rediscovery
 Abandonment (mysticism)

Art, entertainment, and media

Film
 Abandon (film), a 2002 film starring Katie Holmes
 Abandoned (1949 film), starring Dennis O'Keefe
 Abandoned (1955 film), the English language title of the Italian war film Gli Sbandati
 Abandoned (2001 film), a Hungarian film
 Abandoned (2010 film), starring Brittany Murphy
 Abandoned (2015 film), a television movie about the shipwreck of the Rose-Noëlle in 1989
 Abandoned (2022 film), starring Emma Roberts
 The Abandoned (1945 film), a 1945 Mexican film
 The Abandoned (2006 film), by Nacho Cerdà
 The Abandoned (2010 film), starring Mira Furlan
 The Abandoned (2015 film), starring Louisa Krause
 The Abandoned (2022 film), starring Janine Chang
 The Abandonment, a 1916 silent short film

Literature
Abandon, a thriller novel by Blake Crouch
 Abandonment, a play by Kate Atkinson

Music

Groups
 Abandon (band), an alternative rock band on ForeFront Records
 Los Abandoned, music group

Albums
 Abandon (album), a 1998 album by rock band Deep Purple
 Abandoned (album), a 2015 album by hardcore punk band Defeater

Songs
 "Abandoned" (song), a song by Jay Park
 "Abandoned", a song from the Kamelot album The Black Halo
 "The Abandoned", a song from the Memphis May Fire album The Hollow

Television
 Abandoned (TV series), an American reality television series
 "Abandoned" (Lost), episode 30 of Lost, season 2
 "Abandoned", an episode of the TV series Feud
 "Abandoned", an episode of the TV series Power Rangers S.P.D.
 "Abandoned", an episode of the TV series Smallville season 10
 "The Abandoned" (Star Trek: Deep Space Nine), episode 6 of Star Trek: Deep Space Nine, season 3

Video games 

 Abandoned (video game), an upcoming survival horror game being developed by Blue Box Game Studios

Other uses
 Abandoned footwear
 Abandoned pets
 Abandoned railway
 Abandoned village, a human habitat that has been abandoned
 Mate abandonment, in animal behavior, where one parent deserts the other

See also
 Abandonware, a product, typically software, ignored by its owner and manufacturer, and for which no support is available
 
 
 Desertion (disambiguation)